"Never Alone" is song written by American country music artists Rosanne Cash and Vince Gill. It was originally recorded by Cash on her 1985 album Rhythm & Romance and later recorded by Gill for his 1989 album When I Call Your Name.  It was released in September 1989 as the first single from the album and reached number 22 on the Billboard Hot Country Singles chart.

Chart performance

References

1985 songs
1989 singles
Rosanne Cash songs
Vince Gill songs
Songs written by Rosanne Cash
Songs written by Vince Gill
Song recordings produced by Tony Brown (record producer)
MCA Records singles